Philip Francis Adams (1828 – 22 June 1901) was a Surveyor General of New South Wales, Australia.

Adams was born in Suffolk, England in 1828. Ten years later, his family removed to the north of Ireland, and he was educated at the Belfast Institution. In 1851, he emigrated to Canada, and subsequently had an unlucky experience at the Californian diggings. He came to Sydney, Australia in 1854, and was Government Land Surveyor for the Maitland district till 1857. He was afterwards connected with the Trigonometrical Survey of New South Wales. In 1864, he was appointed Deputy Surveyor General, and Surveyor General on 17 March 1868, succeeding Walker Rannie Davidson.

Adams retired on a pension on 31 December 1887, and was a member of the New South Wales Commission in Sydney for the Colonial and Indian Exhibition of 1886.

Notes

References
 National Library of Australia: Adams, Philip Francis (1828–1901)
 Queensland Government: Chain standardisation (Relationship to chain standardisation in Queensland, 1883).
 Encyclopedia of Australian Science: Biographical entry Adams, Philip Francis (1828–1901) 
 First Families 2001: Edward Biddulph (Commander RN) (Father in law and other Queensland connections).

1828 births
1901 deaths
Surveyors General of New South Wales
Australian surveyors
People from Mildenhall, Suffolk
English emigrants to colonial Australia
19th-century Australian politicians